Christopher Weekes (born 22 March 1980) is an Australian film director, film producer, actor, and screenwriter.  He is best known for writing, directing and acting in the 2008 film Bitter & Twisted and for topping the 2009 Hollywood Blacklist with his spec screenplay "The Muppet Man".

Career 
In 2008, Weekes wrote, directed, and acted in the feature Bitter & Twisted, which had its international premiere at the Tribeca Film Festival. It won the Australian Film Critics Circle Award for Best Actress as well as being nominated for two Australian Film Institute Awards, an Independent Film Award and three MIFF awards.

In 2009, it was announced that Weekes would be rewriting the screenplay Waterproof for Legendary Pictures and director Kevin Lima.

Also in 2009, his spec screenplay "The Muppet Man", about the life and death of Jim Henson, topped the Hollywood Blacklist. It is currently in development with Walt Disney Pictures and The Jim Henson Company.

In 2011, it was announced that Weekes would be writing "Ponzi's Scheme", based on the book of the same name by Mitchell Zuckoff, for director Miloš Forman.

Filmography

Actor 
1988 A Country Practice
2002 All Saints
2008 Bitter & Twisted
2012 Puberty Blues

Director 
2008 Bitter & Twisted

Writer 
2008 Bitter & Twisted
2009 "The Muppet Man"
2011 "Ponzi's Scheme"

References 

1980 births
Australian film directors
Australian film producers
Australian screenwriters
Australian male actors
Living people